Positive Slovenia (PS) was a centre-left political party in Slovenia, following April 2014 led by founder Zoran Janković. The party was founded under the name Zoran Janković's List – Positive Slovenia. It was renamed to Positive Slovenia in its second congress, held on 21 January 2012.

History
On 11 October 2011, Janković, then mayor of Ljubljana, announced that he would participate in the early parliamentary election, following the fall of the government of Prime Minister Borut Pahor. The charter of the new party was enacted on 22 October 2011, where Janković was unanimously elected president. Among the party's supporters were National Assembly members Matjaž Zanoškar, Cveta Zalokar Oražem, and Renata Brunskole. Milan Kučan, the first President of Slovenia, also expressed his support, citing Janković's work as the chairman of the retailing chain, Mercator, and as the mayor of Ljubljana.

Among the goals of the party that Janković emphasised were a secure, social and efficient state with a 4% GDP growth rate and less than 3% budget deficit. Janković stated that his goal was to place Slovenia among the most successful countries in the world.

Positive Slovenia won 28.51% of the vote, thus gaining 28 parliamentary seats at the early Slovenian 2011 parliamentary election: the most of all participating political parties. Janković was favourite to become Prime Minister, and Positive Slovenia led coalition negotiations, primarily with the Social Democrats (SD), Gregor Virant's Civic List (LGV), and DeSUS. A preliminary coalition agreement was reached, but LGV withdrew two days later and endorsed a Slovenian Democratic Party-led centre-right government, leaving Positive Slovenia in opposition.

In relation to the 2013 allegations made by the official Commission for the Prevention of Corruption of the Republic of Slovenia, the party temporarily suspended Janković from all functions. Alenka Bratušek became its chair-woman. PS submitted an initiative to dismiss Janša's cabinet, that passed. Bratušek became the first female Prime Minister of Slovenia, and Positive Slovenia became the principal governmental party.

On 30 January 2014, PS applied for membership of the Alliance of Liberals and Democrats for Europe (ALDE), but resigned from its pending membership on 30 April 2014 after the following party congress.

On 26 April 2014, Zoran Janković was again voted as the president of the party with 422 votes for out of 763 voters. His election also caused a split in PS' parliamentary group: 11 deputies formed their own group, while 2 became unaffiliated; 13 deputies ultimately stayed with PS. On 31 May Bratušek's splinter group formed the Alliance of Alenka Bratušek as a separate party.

In the 2014 European election, PS received a mere 6.6% of the vote, failing to return any MEPs.

The party received 2.96% of the vote in the 2014 parliamentary election on 13 July 2014, and did not win any seats in parliament.

The party did not contest the 2018 parliamentary election, or participate in any subsequent elections.

Reception
Janković's decision to create a new political party came together with the announcements of other new parties, such as Gregor Virant's Civic List and the Party for Sustainable Development. The new party gained significant public support even before it was officially chartered, placing first in an opinion poll by the newspaper Delo. Other opinion polls placed the party among the top three.

The leaders of the centre-left parties whom Janković supported in the 2008 election, had reservations about Janković entering state politics. On the other hand, Janez Janša, the opposition leader, claimed that Janković did not bring an alternative to the politics of Slovenia.

In 2011 Slovenian Democratic Party affiliated mayors in eastern Slovenia threatened to split off the regions of Lower Styria and Prekmurje from the central state, claiming that a future government under Janković would pursue a rigorously Ljubljana-centred policy and ignore the interests of the peripheric regions.

Leaders
Zoran Janković, 2011–2013
Alenka Bratušek, 2013–2014
Zoran Janković, 2014–2018

Electoral results

Parliament

Presidential 

Independent candidate, support

References

External links

 
Defunct political parties in Slovenia
Political parties established in 2011
Political parties disestablished in 2018
2011 establishments in Slovenia
2018 disestablishments in Slovenia
Liberal parties in Slovenia
Organizations based in Ljubljana
Pro-European political parties in Slovenia
Social democratic parties in Slovenia
Social liberal parties